There are 76 listed buildings (Swedish: byggnadsminne) in Dalarna County.

Avesta Municipality
placeholder

Borlänge Municipality

Falun Municipality
placeholder

Gagnef Municipality
There are no listed buildings in Gagnef  Municipality.

Hedemora Municipality

Leksand Municipality
placeholder

Ludvika Municipality
placeholder

Malung-Sälen Municipality
placeholder

Mora Municipality
placeholder

Orsa Municipality
placeholder

Rättvik Municipality
placeholder

Smedjebacken Municipality
placeholder

Säter Municipality
placeholder

Vansbro Municipality
placeholder

Älvdalen Municipality
placeholder

External links

  Bebyggelseregistret